Rizky Dwi Pangestu (born 9 April 1999) is an Indonesian professional footballer who plays as a forward for Liga 1 club PSIS Semarang.

Early life

He was born in Banyuwangi, East Java.

Club career

Youth

He played for PON Jatim in 2021.

Kotabaru F.C.

He started his career with Kotabaru.

Semeru F.C.

In 2019, he signed for Semeru.

Serpong City F.C.

In 2021, he signed for Serpong City.

Sulut United F.C.

In 2022, he signed for Sulut United.

PSIS Semarang 
He was signed for PSIS Semarang to play in second round of 2022-23 Liga 1. Rizky made his professional debut on 31 January 2023 in a match against Persib Bandung at the Jatidiri Stadium, Semarang.

Career statistics

Club

References

External links 

 Rizky Dwi Pangestu at Soccerway

1999 births
Living people
Indonesian footballers
Association football forwards
Liga 1 (Indonesia) players
PSIS Semarang players
Sportspeople from East Java